Thornton Hough is a village in Wirral, Merseyside, England.  It contains 40 buildings that are recorded in the National Heritage List for England as designated listed buildings.   Of these, three are listed at Grade II*, the middle of the three grades, and the others are at Grade II, the lowest grade.  The village was developed into a model village in the second half of the 19th century and the early 20th century by two industrialists, first by Joseph Hirst, a textile manufacturer from Yorkshire, and later by Lord Leverhulme, the soap manufacturer who also created the model village of Port Sunlight.  Most of the listed buildings were constructed for them, including the two churches.  The only listed building pre-dating the works of the industrialists are a public house, and Thornton Manor, which was greatly expanded by Lord Leverhulme.

Key

Buildings

References

Citations

Sources

Listed buildings in Merseyside
Lists of listed buildings in Merseyside